Eucalyptus luteola is a species of mallee that is endemic to a small area of Western Australia. It has smooth grey bark with rough greyish ribbons near the base, linear to narrow lance-shaped adult leaves, flower buds in groups of eleven to thirteen, lemon-coloured flowers and cylindrical to barrel-shaped fruit.

Description
It has smooth grey bark with rough and greyish ribbons at the base. Flowering occurs from February to April and the flowers are lemon-coloured.

Taxonomy and naming
Eucalyptus luteola was first formally described in 1991 by Ian Brooker and Stephen Hopper from a specimen collected by Hopper near Lake King in 1985. The description was published in the journal Nuytsia. The specific epithet (luteola) is a Latin word meaning "pale yellow", referring to the flower colour.

Distribution and habitat
This mallee is found in undulating country between Hyden and Ravensthorpe where it grows in sandy soils.

Conservation status
This eucalypt is classified as "not threatened" in Western Australia by the Western Australian Government Department of Parks and Wildlife.

See also
List of Eucalyptus species

References

Eucalypts of Western Australia
luteola
Myrtales of Australia
Plants described in 1991
Taxa named by Ian Brooker
Taxa named by Stephen Hopper